Indian Hills is a census-designated place (CDP) in Douglas County, Nevada, United States. It lies on the south side of the Carson City metropolitan area. The population was 5,627 at the 2010 census.

Geography
Indian Hills is located at  (39.091288, -119.777265).

Demographics

As of the census of 2000, there were 4,407 people, 1,661 households, and 1,297 families residing in the CDP. The racial makeup of the CDP was 91.31% White, 0.23% African American, 1.23% Native American, 0.86% Asian, 4.22% from other races, and 2.16% from two or more races. Hispanic or Latino of any race were 9.48% of the population.

There were 1,661 households, out of which 36.7% had children under the age of 18 living with them, 62.6% were married couples living together, 11.2% had a female householder with no husband present, and 21.9% were non-families. 15.9% of all households were made up of individuals, and 5.1% had someone living alone who was 65 years of age or older. The average household size was 2.65 and the average family size was 2.96.

In the CDP, the population was spread out, with 26.8% under the age of 18, 6.1% from 18 to 24, 28.6% from 25 to 44, 25.7% from 45 to 64, and 12.8% who were 65 years of age or older. The median age was 38 years. For every 100 females, there were 97.3 males. For every 100 females age 18 and over, there were 95.9 males.

The median income for a household in the CDP was $56,109, and the median income for a family was $58,162. Males had a median income of $42,159 versus $28,885 for females. The per capita income for the CDP was $23,027. About 5.9% of families and 5.1% of the population were below the poverty line, including 5.4% of those under age 18 and 10.7% of those age 65 or over.

In popular culture
In the television series Sons of Anarchy, the titular fictional outlaw motorcycle club is depicted as having a charter in Indian Hills.

References

Census-designated places in Douglas County, Nevada
Census-designated places in Nevada